Edder José Farías Martínez (born 12 April 1988) is a Venezuelan footballer who plays as a forward for Deportivo Tachira.

He began his career at Monagas, playing four Primera División Venezolana seasons before a transfer to Caracas in 2012. He has totalled over 125 goals and over 250 appearances in the league, also representing Atlético Venezuela. He added 47 games and 12 goals in Colombia's Categoría Primera A, for Once Caldas and Atlético Junior, and also had a loan at União da Madeira in Portugal's Primeira Liga.

Farías earned nine caps and scored twice for Venezuela between 2010 and 2015.

Club career

Monagas
Born in Maturín, Monagas, Farías began his career at hometown club Monagas Sport Club in the 2008–09 season of the Primera División Venezolana, scoring 8 goals in 27 games in his debut campaign and 9 in 31 in the next.

On 10 April 2011, he came on as a half-time substitute for Edward Leonett and was sent off in the 74th minute for a second booking in an eventual 1–1 draw at Deportivo Petare; on 8 May that season, he scored a hat-trick in a 3–1 win at ACD Lara.

Caracas
Two Chilean clubs and Caracas FC tracked Farías in May 2012. Due to an anterior cruciate ligament injury on 13 July, he did not sign a contract at the capital-based club until 11 December, linking up on a deal until 2015.

On 12 March 2013, Farías netted his first goal for Caracas, the winner in a 2–1 triumph over Grêmio Foot-Ball Porto Alegrense at the Estadio Olímpico in the season's Copa Libertadores. He scored his first league goals for his new club two weeks later, a hat-trick at Portuguesa FC in a 4–3 win. On 12 November 2014, Farías was sent off in the 38th minute of a 2–1 loss at Trujillanos FC, for a foul on Luiyi Erazo which required him to be substituted.

On 24 March 2015, Caracas extended Farías' contract until 2017. That 15 August, he was loaned to C.F. União, newly promoted to Portugal's Primeira Liga for the upcoming season. He scored his first goal for the Madeirans on 27 September, a late consolation in their 2–1 loss at GD Estoril.

On 6 July 2017, as top scorer in the ongoing Venezuelan season with 13 goals in 22 games, Farías was loaned to Once Caldas of Colombia. After scoring eight goals in the 2018 season, he became too valuable for the club to purchase, and his loan was rescinded on 22 May.

Atlético Venezuela
On 13 July 2018, Farías signed a two-year contract at Atlético Venezuela CF. In the 2019 Apertura season, he was top scorer with 18 goals in 21 games for the quarter-finalists. This included a hat-trick on 9 February in a 3–2 win at LALA FC for the first victory of the season for the team from Puerto la Cruz.

On 28 June 2019, Farías returned to Colombia, signing a year-long loan with reigning champions Atlético Junior. In December, having not scored for the team from Barranquilla, this was curtailed and he returned to Atlético Venezuela.

Universidad Católica
On 19 January 2021, Farías signed for C.D. Universidad Católica del Ecuador. He scored a hat-trick on 9 May in a 6–2 win at Mushuc Runa SC.

International career
Farías made his full international debut for Venezuela on 2 February 2010, as an added-time replacement for Alejandro Moreno at the end of a goalless friendly draw against Japan at the Ōita Bank Dome. On 20 May in Oranjestad, he scored his first international goal, concluding a 3–0 win over Aruba.

On 4 February 2015, Farías came off the bench to score in a 3–2 away win over Honduras, breaking a sequence of five consecutive defeats for the Vinotinto with their first victory since September 2013.

International goals
Scores and results list Venezuela's goal tally first.

References

External links
 
 

1988 births
Living people
People from Maturín
Venezuelan footballers
Association football forwards
Monagas S.C. players
Caracas FC players
C.F. União players
Once Caldas footballers
Atlético Venezuela C.F. players
Atlético Junior footballers
C.D. Universidad Católica del Ecuador footballers
Venezuelan Primera División players
Primeira Liga players
Categoría Primera A players
Ecuadorian Serie A players
Venezuela international footballers
Venezuelan expatriate footballers
Expatriate footballers in Portugal
Expatriate footballers in Colombia
Expatriate footballers in Ecuador
Venezuelan expatriate sportspeople in Portugal
Venezuelan expatriate sportspeople in Colombia
Venezuelan expatriate sportspeople in Ecuador